The 2021 Ferrari Challenge North America is the 27th season of Ferrari Challenge competition in North America. The season is scheduled to consist of 7 rounds, starting at the Virginia International Raceway on March 27 and concluding at the Mugello Circuit on November 20.

Calendar

Entry list
All teams and drivers used the Ferrari 488 Challenge Evo fitted with Pirelli tyres. At round 7 in Mugello Ferrari Challenge North America entries ran with a different numbers, trofeo pirelli entries with their number in the 200's and Coppa Shell entries with theri number in the 300's.

Trofeo Pirelli

Coppa Shell

Results and standings

Race results

Championship standings
Points were awarded to the top ten classified finishers as follows:

Trofeo Pirelli

Coppa Shell

References

External links
 Official website

North America 2021
Ferrari Challenge North America
Ferrari Challenge North America